Psycho Circus may refer to:

Psycho Circus, a 1998 album by the American hard rock/heavy metal band Kiss
"Psycho Circus" (song), a track on this album
Kiss: Psycho Circus, a comics title published by Image comics from 1997 to 2000
Kiss: Psycho Circus: The Nightmare Child, a first person shooter computer game developed by Third Law Interactive
Los Psycho Circus, a Mexican wrestling group
 The American title of the 1966 film Circus of Fear